Enoplidia is a genus of moths of the family Oecophoridae.

Species
Enoplidia simplex (Turner, 1896)
Enoplidia stenomorpha (Turner, 1946)

References

Markku Savela's ftp.funet.fi

 
Oecophorinae